Enantia melite is a species of butterfly that is found from Central America to the Amazon Basin.

Subspecies
E. m. melite (Surinam)
E. m. theugenis (Doubleday, 1848) (Bolivia, Peru)
E. m. linealis (Prüffer, 1922) (Peru)
E. m. vilma Lamas, 2004 (Brazil: Rondônia)

Gallery

References

External links

Dismorphiinae
Pieridae of South America
Butterflies described in 1763
Taxa named by Carl Linnaeus
Butterflies of Central America